Kim Andersson (born 21 August 1982) is a Swedish handball player for Ystads IF.

He was voted into the All-Star Team as Best right back at the 2008 European Men's Handball Championship, where Sweden finished 5th. He was part of the Swedish team that won the silver medal at the 2012 Summer Olympics.

Club play
Andersson participated on the THW Kiel team that won the EHF Champions League in 2007. He is Swedish champion from 2004 and 2005 with IK Sävehof, and German champion from 2006 and 2007 with THW Kiel. He once again became Swedish champion 2022 with Ystads IF.

References

External links
Kim Andersson on THW Kiel's webpage

1982 births
Living people
Swedish male handball players
Expatriate handball players
Swedish expatriate sportspeople in Denmark
Swedish expatriate sportspeople in Germany
Handball players at the 2012 Summer Olympics
Handball players at the 2016 Summer Olympics
Olympic handball players of Sweden
Olympic silver medalists for Sweden
Olympic medalists in handball
Medalists at the 2012 Summer Olympics
Ystads IF players
IK Sävehof players
THW Kiel players
KIF Kolding players
Handball-Bundesliga players
People from Kävlinge Municipality
Sportspeople from Skåne County